Multifocal lens may refer to:

Progressive lens, used in eyeglasses
Multifocal intraocular lens
Multifocal diffractive lens, a diffractive optical element used with lasers

Lenses